The Raft River is a  tributary of the Snake River located in northern Utah and southern Idaho in the United States. It is part of the Columbia River Basin.

Course
The Raft River's headwaters are mostly on the east side of the Albion Mountains, southeast of Oakley, Idaho. But its Clear Creek tributary also drains the north side of the Raft River Mountains in Utah, and runoff from the nearby Grouse Creek Range also flows into the Raft River. Portions of the Black Pine and Sublett mountains are also in the river's watershed. The river flows generally north to join the Snake River in Cassia County, Idaho.

Watershed

History
The river is named for the fact Oregon Trail pioneers would cross the river with rafts, which was often flooded as a result of beaver dams.

At the top of the bluff above Raft River, the "Parting of the Ways" took place. The Oregon Trail continued west, and the California Trail headed south. Graves of those who died from being mortally wounded at Massacre Rocks can be found in the same area along the river. The Clark Massacre of 1851 took place near the Raft River itself.

See also
List of rivers of Idaho
List of longest streams of Idaho
List of rivers of Utah
Tributaries of the Columbia River

References

External links

Rivers of Idaho
Rivers of Utah
Rivers of Cassia County, Idaho
Tributaries of the Snake River
Rivers of Box Elder County, Utah